Simone Gomes Jatobá (born 10 February 1981), commonly known as Simone, is a Brazilian football coach and former player. She was appointed coach of the Brazil women's national under-17 football team in August 2019.

Club career
Simone began her career in Campeonato Brasileiro's Ponte Preta, Santos FC and Saad EC. In 2004, she moved to Rayo Vallecano in the Spanish Superliga, and next year she signed for Olympique Lyonnais, where she played for the next five years. She was a solid contributor to the squads that won the league in 2007 and 2008, as well as the squad that won the Challenge de France in 2008. In 2010, she returned to Brazil, playing for Novo Mundo FC, but two years later she signed for Energiya Voronezh in the Russian Championship.

In June 2019 38-year-old Simone left FC Metz after five seasons and retired from playing football.

International career
In June 2000 Simone made her international debut in Brazil's 8–0 CONCACAF Women's Gold Cup win over Costa Rica at Hersheypark Stadium, Hershey, Pennsylvania. As a 19-year-old she played at the 2000 Sydney Olympics, where Brazil finished fourth after losing 2–0 to Germany in the bronze medal match at Sydney Football Stadium.

Simone has been a part of two World Cup squads. She was a part of the squad from 2003 that finished as quarter-finalists and the squad that finished in second place in China. She also participated in the 2008 Summer Olympics, again helping Brazil finish one spot short in second place.

She usually plays as a right winger for the Brazilian National Team.

Personal life
Her uncle Carlos Roberto Jatobá was also a professional footballer.

References

1981 births
Living people
Brazilian women's footballers
Women's association football midfielders
People from Maringá
Olympic footballers of Brazil
Olympic silver medalists for Brazil
Footballers at the 2008 Summer Olympics
Olympique Lyonnais Féminin players
Brazilian expatriate women's footballers
Expatriate women's footballers in France
Brazilian expatriate sportspeople in France
Brazilian expatriate sportspeople in Spain
Expatriate women's footballers in Spain
Olympic medalists in football
Medalists at the 2008 Summer Olympics
Primera División (women) players
Rayo Vallecano Femenino players
Brazil women's international footballers
FC Metz (women) players
Saad Esporte Clube (women) players
Division 1 Féminine players
Brazilian expatriate sportspeople in Russia
Expatriate women's footballers in Russia
2007 FIFA Women's World Cup players
2003 FIFA Women's World Cup players
FC Energy Voronezh players
Sportspeople from Paraná (state)
Pan American Games medalists in football
Footballers at the 2007 Pan American Games
Pan American Games gold medalists for Brazil
Medalists at the 2007 Pan American Games